Sneaky Sunday is an Atlanta-based nightlife and entertainment review website that hosts recommendations for bars, clubs, restaurants, hotels, leisure activities and live entertainment venues in over 90 U.S. cities. The founders describe their target audience as "young professionals."

Site Features
Sneaky Sunday has an online database of recommendations and rankings of over 50 categories of local restaurants, bars, music venues, and hotels in over 90 major U.S. cities.  Visitors to the site choose their city of interest and navigate through four main categories:  bars/clubs, restaurants, live entertainment, and hotels/leisure.  Each category is broken out into sub-categories that contain recommendations for only the best venues within a category (i.e. Best Dive Bar, Best Beer Selection, etc.).

Other site features include a daily events calendar in every city with listings for the next 30 days of all major local events within music, sports, live theater, art, comedy, dance, and special events.  Each venue can also feature maps, user reviews, short-form video (SneakySunday TV), and SMS messaging.  Visitors have the ability to make restaurant reservations through OpenTable .com as well.

History
The idea for Sneaky Sunday was born in 2006 when Paul Broft (CEO), Collective Soul guitarist Dean Roland and Cary Franklin (COO) were at a sports bar and noticed it was unusually crowded for a Sunday.  They realized people frequently ventured out on “school nights” but didn't necessarily know where to go on untraditional nights thus Sneaky Sunday was born. Introduced online and tested with 20 U.S. cities beginning in August 2007, an expanded site covering more than 90 cities re-launched on April 1, 2008."Think of it as  GPS for your social life," commented The Atlantan magazine.

As of January 25, 2013, Sneaky Sunday is no longer online.

References

External links
www.SneakySunday.com
Atlanta Business Chronicle: Sneaking Into Your Weekend\
360 Media Press Release: SneakySunday.com Launches All-New, Unique Nightlife Site

American review websites
American entertainment websites
Companies based in Atlanta